The Bizot group, sometimes called The International Group of Organizers of Major Exhibitions, and also known as Groupe Bizot (named after Irène Bizot, director of the Réunion des musées nationaux, the origin of this group), is a group, founded in 1992, which periodically brings together the directors of the largest museums in the world, constituting a place for exchanging ideas, recent museum news, and a forum for discussing ideas.

Purpose
These meetings are intended to facilitate trade between major museums, both in terms of works and exhibitions that ideas. The group initially included only European institutions, but then expanded to other selected institutions.

In December 2002, the Bizot group published a declaration, "Declaration on the Importance and Value of Universal Museums", in which it argues against requests for the return of objects or installations by the countries from which these objects originated, and defends the interest of "universal museums".

Members
A letter of November 2014, from the consolidation, cites the main members of the group at the time.

 Réunion des musées nationaux et du Grand Palais des Champs-Élysées
 National Gallery Singapore
 Musée du Louvre
 Musée d'Art moderne de la Ville de Paris
 Musée d'Orsay
 Musée des beaux-arts de Lyon
 Metropolitan Museum of Art
 British Museum
 Centre national d'art et de culture Georges-Pompidou
 Musée des beaux-arts de Montréal
 Musée de l'Ermitage
 Musée des beaux-arts du Canada
 Art Gallery of Ontario
 Royal Museums of Fine Arts of Belgium
 Musées royaux d'art et d'histoire de Bruxelles
 Museo Reina Sofía
 Musée du Prado
 Museu Nacional d'Art de Catalunya
 Art Institute of Chicago
 Museum of Fine Arts (Budapest)

Previous meetings (selected)
Berlin, 2015
Montréal, 2006
Munich, 2003

References

External links
 Environmental sustainability - reducing museums' carbon footprint ; Bizot Interim Guidelines.

Organizations established in 1992
Museum organizations